Sermentizon is a commune in the Puy-de-Dôme département in Auvergne in central France.

Its inhabitants are called Sermentizonais (male) or Sermentizonaises (female).

Sites and monuments 
 Château d'Aulteribe, medieval castle restored in 19th century

See also
Communes of the Puy-de-Dôme department

References

Communes of Puy-de-Dôme